Tina Müller (born 1 December 1977 in Ringsted) is a Danish sports journalist and television presenter who hosted the Dansk Melodi Grand Prix 2021 and the 2022 edition, both on DR1. She was the spokesperson for Denmark's jury votes in the final of the Eurovision Song Contest 2021 and again in 2022.

References

External links 

1977 births
Danish television presenters
Living people